Wadalba is a suburb of the Central Coast region of New South Wales, Australia. It is part of the  local government area.

It contains Wadalba Community School as well as a Woolworths supermarket, Coles supermarket and shopping centre (including Chemist, Medical Centre, Newsagent, Indian/Kebab takeaway, Chinese restaurant and bakery cafe), McDonald's family restaurant, Seven Eleven service station, Rural pet supply store, childcare centre and liquor store.

References

Suburbs of the Central Coast (New South Wales)